José Luis Granda Bravo (born  13 April 1992) is a Peruvian footballer. He currently plays for Alfonso Ugarte.

Club career
José Granda began his senior career with Sporting Cristal, joining their first team in January 2010. He made his Torneo Descentralizado league debut on 20 February 2010 playing the entire match in Cristal's 3–1 home win over FBC Melgar. He played from start again in his second league match in the 1–0 win over Total Chalaco on matchday 13. Granda made only five league appearances in his debut season under manager Víctor Rivera.

The following season, he made ten league appearances for Cristal. In the 2012 season he only featured in one match, scoring his first league goal in the 1–2 away win over FBC Melgar.

Then in August 2012 Granda joined newly promoted side Real Garcilaso.

In February 2018, Granda moved to Alfonso Ugarte. After a year in San Cristóbal, Granda re-joined Alfonso Ugarte in March 2020.

References

External links

1992 births
Living people
Association football defenders
Peruvian footballers
Sporting Cristal footballers
Real Garcilaso footballers
Universidad Técnica de Cajamarca footballers
León de Huánuco footballers
Sport Loreto players
Deportivo Coopsol players
Alfonso Ugarte de Puno players
Peruvian Primera División players